Malcolm Shaw may refer to:

 Malcolm Shaw (academic) (born 1947), British legal academic, author, editor and lawyer
 Malcolm Shaw (rower) (1947–2014), New Zealand-born, Australian representative rower
 Malcolm Shaw (soccer) (born 1995), Canadian professional soccer player
 Malcolm Shaw (comics) (1946–1984), British comics writers and editor